Pia Wunderlich (born 26 January 1975 in Schwarzenau) is a German former footballer 
who played as a midfielder. She played solely for 1. FFC Frankfurt at professional club level and was selected for the German national team 102 times, winning major honours with both. She was recognised by Spanish club Athletic Bilbao with the One Club Woman Award for her services to Frankfurt.

Her younger sister Tina played alongside her at Frankfurt, and with Germany.

International goals

Honours
1. FFC Frankfurt
 UEFA Cup: Winner 2001–02, 2005–06 and 2007–08
 Fußball-Bundesliga: 1999, 2001, 2002, 2003, 2005 and 2007
 DFB-Pokal: 1999, 2000, 2001, 2002, 2003, 2007 and 2008
 DFB-Hallenpokal: 1997, 1999 and 2002

SG Praunheim
 DFB-Hallenpokal: 1998

Germany
 World Cup: winner 2003, runner-up 1995
 European Champion: winner 1997, 2001 and 2005

Individual
One Club Woman Award: 2020

References

External links
DFB profile

1975 births
Living people
German women's footballers
Germany women's international footballers
Footballers at the 1996 Summer Olympics
Footballers at the 2004 Summer Olympics
Olympic bronze medalists for Germany
People from Siegen-Wittgenstein
Sportspeople from Arnsberg (region)
1. FFC Frankfurt players
FIFA Century Club
Olympic medalists in football
Medalists at the 2004 Summer Olympics
1995 FIFA Women's World Cup players
1999 FIFA Women's World Cup players
2003 FIFA Women's World Cup players
FIFA Women's World Cup-winning players
Women's association football midfielders
Olympic footballers of Germany
UEFA Women's Championship-winning players
Footballers from North Rhine-Westphalia